The Virginian was an automobile produced briefly, 1911 and 1912, by the Richmond Iron Works of Richmond, Virginia, USA.

References

See also
Kline Kar

1910s cars
Defunct motor vehicle manufacturers of the United States